Tianmen Mountain is a mountain located within Tianmen Mountain National Park, Zhangjiajie, in the northwestern part of Hunan Province, China.

Mountain
A cablecar was constructed in 2005 by the French company Poma from nearby Zhangjiajie railway station to the top of the mountain. The highest gradient is 37 degrees. Tourists can walk on kilometres of paths built along the cliff face at the top of the mountain, including sections with glass floors.

The Tianmenshan Temple is located on the summit, with chairlift or footpath access. The original temple there was built during the Tang dynasty and destroyed during the first part of the 20th century. In 1949, as the Chinese Communist Revolution neared its end, construction of a new temple, with Tang dynasty architecture, began; the temple now sits on landscaped grounds covering .

In 2007, Alain Robert scaled the cliff below the arch, bare-handed and without protection; a  commemorates his feat.

The World Wingsuit League held the first and second World Wingsuit Championships in Tianmen. On October 8, 2013, during a training jump for the second world championships, Viktor Kováts plunged to his death when he was unable to open his parachute.

In August 2016, a glass skywalk overlooking Tongtian Avenue, called the "Coiling Dragon Cliff", opened to the public.

In September 2016, the Italian driver Fabio Barone set the first speed world record with his Ferrari 458 Italia, covering the nearly 11 km (6.8-mile) route in 10 minutes and 31 seconds.

References

Mountains of Hunan
Tourist attractions in Zhangjiajie